C70 may refer to:
 Berkshire Concept 70 sailplane
 C70 fullerene, carbon-70, a common fullerene, a carbon molecule
 Georges Leygues class frigates, a type of anti-submarine frigates of the French Navy.
 Honda Super Cub C70 motorcycle
 Volvo C70, a car
 Ruy Lopez chess openings ECO code
 Malignant neoplasm of meninges ICD-10 code
 Caldwell 70 (NGC 300), a spiral galaxy in the constellation Sculptor